Professor Christopher Richard James Woodhouse, 6th Baron Terrington (born 20 September 1946), is a British peer and Emeritus Professor of Adolescent Urology, University College London.

Terrington was born in 1946, the elder son of Montague Woodhouse, 5th Baron Terrington, and Lady Davidema Katharine Cynthia Mary Millicent Bulwer-Lytton, a daughter of Victor Bulwer-Lytton, 2nd Earl of Lytton. He was educated at Winchester College and Guy's Hospital Medical School. Throughout his academic career he was an avid coxswain, steering Winchester College, University of London and Leander Club crews.

Terrington became a urological surgeon in 1970.  He was senior registrar at the Institute of Urology from 1977 to 1981 and senior lecturer from 1981 until 1997. In the latter year he moved to University College Hospital as Reader in Adolescent Urology, and professor from 2006. He has been Clinical Director of Urology at the same institution since 2001. He was a consultant at St George's Hospital from 1985 to 1995 and has occupied the same position at the Royal Marsden Hospital since 1981 as well as that of honorary consultant at Great Ormond Street Hospital since 1981. 

He became a Fellow of the Royal College of Physicians in 1975.  In addition, Terrington has been an honorary member of the Australasian Urological Association since 1999, Chairman of the British Journal of Urology since 2000 and President of Genito-Urinary Reconstructive Surgeons (USA) since 2002.  

He inherited his title when his father died in 2001. He was an unsuccessful candidate for election as a crossbench hereditary peer in the House of Lords by-election held in May 2008.

Marriage and children
Terrington married Hon. Anna Margaret Philipps, the daughter of Hugo Philipps, 3rd Baron Milford, on 27 February 1975. They have two children:

 Hon. Jack Henry Lehmann Woodhouse (born 7 December 1978), heir apparent to the barony.
 Hon. Constance Margaret Davina Woodhouse (born 1 January 1982)

Publications
With F. D. Thompson: Disorders of the Kidney and Urinary Tract (1987) 
Long-Term Paediatric Urology (1991) 
With others: Management of Urological Emergencies (2004)

Arms

References

Burke's Peerage
Who's Who 2009

1946 births
Living people
Barons in the Peerage of the United Kingdom
British urologists
People educated at Winchester College
Members of Leander Club
British surgeons
Fellows of the Royal College of Physicians